Limes (pronounced ) is a monthly Italian geopolitical magazine published in Rome, Italy.

History and profile
Limes was established in 1993. The magazine, published every month, is owned by Gruppo Editoriale L'Espresso. Lucio Caracciolo is the editor of the magazine.

It had two sister publications: the English-language Heartland, Eurasian Review of Geopolitics (2000-?) and the Serbo-Croatian Limesplus (2013-2020, available papers are in Serbian and English).

Members of the scientific and editorial board of Limes include Geminello Alvi, Furio Colombo, Giuseppe Cucchi, Emanuela Del Re, Ilvo Diamanti, Augusto Fantozzi, Tito Favaretto, Ernesto Galli della Loggia, Carlo Jean, Enrico Letta, Ricardo Franco Levi, Vincenzo Paglia, Angelo Panebianco, Romano Prodi, Giulio Tremonti, Antonio Zanardi Landi, Luigi Zanda, Guido Barendson, Pierluigi Battista, Andrea Damascelli, Włodek Goldkorn, Paolo Morawski, David Polansky, Alessandro Politi, Antonio Sema and Enzo Traverso. Some of them are also members of the boards of  ENI, Leonardo-Finmeccanica and of Gazprom-controlled companies. One of them, Massimo Nicolazzi, writes about energy-related topics, including those related to Russia.

Limes maps Crimea as a part of Russia since December 2015. After protests by the Ukrainian embassy in Italy, the magazine editor Lucio Caracciolo wrote that "the maps reflects reality. When Crimea and Sevastopol will be back under effective Ukrainian sovereignty, we will produce a map that reflects such reality". Limes does not use the same approach to the other frozen conflicts and de facto states of the post-Soviet area, even on the same maps . In other maps, Crimea is shown as contested.

See also
 List of magazines published in Italy

References

1993 establishments in Italy
Italian-language magazines
Magazines established in 1993
Magazines published in Rome
Monthly magazines published in Italy
Political magazines published in Italy